James Farentino (February 24, 1938 – January 24, 2012) was an American actor. He appeared in nearly 100 television, film, and stage roles, among them The Final Countdown, Jesus of Nazareth, and Dynasty.

Career
Born in Brooklyn, New York, Farentino attended local schools followed later by studying drama and acting in Catholic school.

In the 1950s and 1960s, he performed on the stage and a few TV roles. Among his many television appearances, he guest-starred in 1964 with Efrem Zimbalist, Jr. in the episode "Super-Star" of the CBS drama series The Reporter. He starred in The Alfred Hitchcock Hour alongside Vera Miles and John Carradine (episode "Death Scene").  Early in 1967, he appeared in Barry Sullivan's NBC Western series The Road West in the episode "Reap the Whirlwind". In 1969, he starred opposite Patty Duke in the film Me, Natalie. Farentino was one of the lawyers in NBC's TV series The Bold Ones (1969–1972), which also starred Burl Ives and Joseph Campanella. He made two appearances in the 1970s anthology television series Night Gallery, once with then-wife Michele Lee ("Since Aunt Ada Came to Stay"), and next with actress Joanna Pettet ("The Girl with the Hungry Eyes"). Also in 1970, Farentino appeared as Pick Lexington in The Men From Shiloh (the repackaged name of the popular long-running TV Western The Virginian) in the episode titled "The Best Man". In 1973, he appeared in the episode "The Soft, Kind Brush" of the romantic anthology series Love Story. During the 1970s, he appeared on NBC's Cool Million.

In 1978, he was nominated for an Primetime Emmy Award for Outstanding Supporting Actor in a Limited Series or Movie for his portrayal of Simon Peter in the miniseries Jesus of Nazareth. In 1980, Farentino starred in The Final Countdown with Kirk Douglas and Martin Sheen, and then played Juan Perón opposite Faye Dunaway's Eva Perón in the 1981 television film Evita Perón. Farentino appeared as Frank Chaney in the short-lived 1984 ABC series Blue Thunder, based on the 1983 film of the same name, starring Roy Scheider. He starred as Dr. Nick Toscanni on the second season of Dynasty from 1981 to 1982.  In the late 1990s, he appeared as the estranged father of lead character Doug Ross on ER.

Personal life
Farentino was married to:
 Elizabeth Ashley (September 1, 1962 – 1965; divorced)
 Michele Lee (February 20, 1966 – 1982; divorced); one child, David (born July 6, 1969).
 Debrah Farentino (June 1985 – 1988; divorced)
 Stella Farentino (August 3, 1994 – his death); Stella filed for divorce in 1998 due to "irreconcilable differences", but later withdrew her petition. Then, James himself filed for divorce in January 2001, also due to "irreconcilable differences"; however, the couple remained married until his death.

Farentino was charged with stalking his former girlfriend Tina Sinatra (the youngest child of Frank Sinatra) in 1993. A restraining order was issued against him after he entered a plea of nolo contendere.

Farentino was arrested in Vancouver, British Columbia, on July 23, 1991, after Canada Customs intercepted a package containing 3.2 g of cocaine being sent to his hotel room. He was in town filming the television film Miles from Nowhere. He was charged with cocaine possession and released on bail.

In 2010, Farentino was arrested on suspicion of misdemeanor battery after police were called following a citizen's arrest of the actor in his own house. Farentino was taken into custody and booked at the Los Angeles Police Department's Hollywood station before being released the following morning after posting a $20,000 bond. Police said the actor was trying to physically remove a man from his house, and the man then made the citizen's arrest

Death
On January 24, 2012, Farentino died of sequelae arising from a right hip fracture, at Cedars-Sinai Medical Center in Los Angeles, California, following a long illness. He was 73 years old.

Selected filmography

 Violent Midnight (1963) - Charlie Perone
 Ensign Pulver (1964) - Insigna
 The War Lord (1965) - Marc
 The Pad and How to Use It (1966) - Ted
 The Ride to Hangman's Tree (1967) - Matt Stone
 Banning (1967) - Chris Patton
 Rosie! (1967) - David Wheelright
 Me, Natalie (1969) - David Harris
 Story of a Woman (1970) - Bruno Cardini
 The Longest Night (1972, TV movie) - John Danbury
 The Elevator (1974, TV movie) - Eddie Holcomb
 Jesus of Nazareth (1977, TV miniseries) - Simon Peter
 The Possessed (1977, TV movie) - Kevin Leahy
 The Final Countdown (1980) - Cdr. Richard Owens / Mr.Tideman
 Evita Perón (1981, TV movie) - Juan Peron
 Dead & Buried (1981) - Sheriff Dan Gillis
 Dynasty (1982–1983) - Dr. Nick Toscanni
 License to Kill (1984, TV movie) - John Peterson
 Mary (1985) - Frank DeMarco 
 Rand McNally's Hawaii VideoTrip (1986, hosted) 
 Sins (miniseries) (1986) - David Westfield 
 Naked Lie (1989) - Jonathan Morris
 Her Alibi (1989) - Frank Polito
 When No One Would Listen (1992) - Gary Cochran
 Deep Down (1994) - Joey
 Bulletproof (1996) - Capt. Jensen
 Termination Man (1998) - Cain
 The Last Producer (2000) - Poker Player
 Women of the Night (2001) - Sabatini

References

External links
 
 

1938 births
2012 deaths
20th-century American male actors
21st-century American male actors
American male film actors
American male television actors
American people of Italian descent
Male actors from New York City
New Star of the Year (Actor) Golden Globe winners
People from Brooklyn